Olisaemeka Udoh (born February 14, 1997) is an American football guard for the Minnesota Vikings of the National Football League (NFL). He played college football at Elon and was drafted by the Vikings in the sixth round, 193rd overall in the 2019 NFL Draft.

Early years
Born to Benjamin and Rita Udoh in Fayetteville, North Carolina, Udoh attended Terry Sanford High School. He started playing football as a defensive lineman before transitioning to the offensive side of the ball as a senior, earning second team Cape Fear Region honors after helping the program reach the playoffs for the second consecutive year. Udoh was a NCHSAA student-athlete honoree in both 2012 and 2013 and also lettered in track and field in his final season, recording a top-throw of 44'5" (13.54m) in the shot put.

College career
After taking a redshirt year in 2014, Udoh never missed a game with a total of 45 starts throughout his college career at Elon. He was named to the CAA Football Academic All-Conference Team in both 2015 and 2016. In 2018, he earned a spot as a Phil Steele FCS First Team All American and was invited to the NFLPA Collegiate Bowl.

Professional career

Udoh was drafted by the Minnesota Vikings with the 193rd overall pick in the sixth round of the 2019 NFL Draft.

Udoh was placed on the reserve/COVID-19 list by the Vikings on July 29, 2020. He was activated on August 13, 2020.

Legal troubles
Udoh was arrested during the bye week in 2022 for reportedly following a woman into a bathroom at a bar and refusing to leave and was charged with disorderly conduct and resisting arrest. The charges were later dismissed and his lawyer characterized the arrest as unlawful.

References

1997 births
Living people
Players of American football from North Carolina
Sportspeople from Fayetteville, North Carolina
American football offensive tackles
Elon Phoenix football players
Minnesota Vikings players